Mario Simioni (born April 1, 1963) is a Canadian-Italian professional ice hockey coach and former professional ice hockey player. He has been serving as head coach of the Frederikshavn White Hawks since May 2016.

Playing career 
Born in Toronto, Ontario, Canada, Simioni was drafted by the Calgary Flames in the 1981 NHL Draft (5th round, 99th overall), but never played in the National Hockey League. However, he saw action for the Colorado Flames, then Calgary's CHL affiliate, in 1982-83 and 1983-84. He split the 1984-85 season between the Salt Lake Golden Eagles of the IHL and the Moncton Golden Flames of the AHL, before continuing his pro career in Europe. Simioni signed with Asiago of the Italian Serie A and would dominate the league in scoring during his seven-year stint. A Canadian of Italian descent, he was named to the Italian national team, representing the country at three World Championships (two in Group B, 1992 in the highest division).

From 1994 to 1998, Simioni played for Vojens IK, continuing his scoring prowess in the Danish league. He then spent the 1998-99 campaign with the Cardiff Devils of the British Ice Hockey Superleague and the 1999-00 season with the Odense Bulldogs of Denmark. In Odense, he served as player-coach and put an end to his playing career in the year 2000.

Career statistics

Coaching career 
Simioni focused on coaching at Odense after serving as player-coach in 1999-00. In his five-year stint with the Bulldogs, he guided the team to the playoff-finals in 2002 and 2003, while winning the 2003 Danish Cup competition.

In April 2004, Simioni was appointed head coach of German first-division side Krefeld Pinguine, but was sacked only some months later, in October, after having won only three of the ten opening games of the 2004-05 season. He returned to Denmark and took over head coaching duties at SønderjyskE in December 2005, kicking off a "golden era". Under Simioni's guidance, the club which he had played for in the late 1990s (named Vojens IK back then) won four Danish championships (2006, 2009, 2010, 2013), four bronze medals (2007, 2008, 2011, 2012), three Danish Cup titles (2010, 2011, 2013) and one bronze medal in the 2010-11 IIHF Continental Cup. He parted ways with SønderjyskE following the 2012-13 season.

In August 2014, Simioni accepted the head coaching job at HC Bozen of the Austrian Hockey League, he was released in February 2015. In April 2015, he was named head coach of Danish outfit Herning Blue Fox and led the team to a finals appearance in the 2015-16 season, where they fell short to Esbjerg Energy. Simioni left Herning after one year to join the coaching staff of the Hamburg Freezers of the Deutsche Eishockey Liga (DEL) in Germany as an assistant to Serge Aubin. However, the Hamburg team folded in May 2016 and a couple of days after this announcement had been made, Simioni was named head coach of the Frederikshavn White Hawks of the Danish top-flight Metal Ligaen.

References

External links 
 

1963 births
Living people
Asiago Hockey 1935 players
Calgary Flames draft picks
Canadian ice hockey coaches
Cardiff Devils players
Colorado Flames players
Italian ice hockey left wingers
Moncton Golden Flames players
Odense Bulldogs players
Salt Lake Golden Eagles (IHL) players
Ice hockey people from Toronto
Toronto Marlboros players
Vojens IK players
Canadian sportspeople of Italian descent
Canadian expatriate ice hockey players in Wales
Canadian expatriate ice hockey players in the United States
Canadian expatriate ice hockey players in Italy
Naturalised citizens of Italy
Canadian expatriate ice hockey players in Denmark
Italian expatriate ice hockey people
Italian expatriate sportspeople in Wales
Italian expatriate sportspeople in Denmark
Canadian expatriate sportspeople in Germany
Italian expatriate sportspeople in Germany
Italian ice hockey coaches